Star Wars Trilogy is a 1997 pinball machine released by Sega Pinball. It is based in the Star Wars original trilogy. It was released in the year of the release of the special editions of the films. The backbox features an optional lenticular lens 3D image, a pinball industry first.

Gameplay
There are six modes called heroics. The top hole starts a mode and feeds the ball to the left inlane via the cannon. The modes are:

Leia: Choke Jabba the Hutt. The display shows Leia with a chain around Jabba's neck that Leia pulls tighter with every ramp shot. 3 ramps chokes Jabba. The ramps score 200k then 300k and finally 400k. The mode lasts about 30 seconds.
Luke: Load the X-Wing and shoot the ball through the narrow lane within 30 seconds for a 500k jackpot.
Chewie: Rebuild C-3PO. The ramp, both orbits and the top hole score points and award a body part. The points awarded are 100k, 200k, 300k and finally 400k.
C-3PO/R2-D2: Shoot the top hole 3 times to stop the trash compactor. Each shot scores 50k+ 100k.
Obi Wan: Shoot the lit shots to confuse the stormtroopers. The first shot is the right orbit, then the ramp, then the left orbit. Each shot scores 150k+ 100k per shot. 
Han Solo: A hurry-up. Shoot the right hole to escape from the slug. The value starts at 420k.

At the start of the game the player is given the choice of playing either the normal 3 ball game or a novice game that guarantees a 2-minute game time with the ball saver active. When the ball saver times out, the first drain ends the game. Holding in the left flipper and pressing start gives League mode and holding the right flipper gives Wizard mode.

References

External links
 
 Recent Auction Results for Star Wars Trilogy

Trilogy
Sega pinball machines
1997 pinball machines
Pinball machines based on films